Max Ray Sherman (born January 19, 1935) is a Texas politician and educational administrator who served in the Texas State Senate from Amarillo, Texas, and was president of West Texas A&M University in Canyon, and dean of the Lyndon B. Johnson School of Public Affairs at the University of Texas at Austin.

References

1935 births
Living people
People from Fulton County, Arkansas
Politicians from Amarillo, Texas
People from Hutchinson County, Texas
Politicians from Austin, Texas
Baylor University alumni
Heads of universities and colleges in the United States
Democratic Party Texas state senators
Texas lawyers
United States Army officers
University of Texas School of Law alumni
Military personnel from Texas